The 2004 Pacific Life Open was a tennis tournament played on outdoor hard courts. It was the 31st edition of the Indian Wells Masters and was part of the Masters Series of the 2004 ATP Tour and of Tier I of the 2004 WTA Tour. Both the men's and women's events took place at the Indian Wells Tennis Garden in Indian Wells, California in the United States from March 10 through March 21, 2004.

Champions

Men's singles

 Roger Federer defeated  Tim Henman 6–3, 6–3 
 It was Federer's 3rd title of the year and the 14th of his career. It was his 1st Masters title of the year and his 2nd overall.

Women's singles

 Justine Henin-Hardenne defeated  Lindsay Davenport 6–1, 6–4
 It was Henin-Hardenne's 4th title of the year and the 20th of her career. It was her 1st Tier I title of the year and her 6th overall.

Men's doubles

 Arnaud Clément /  Sébastien Grosjean defeated  Wayne Black /  Kevin Ullyett 6–3, 4–6, 7–5
 It was Clément's 1st title of the year and the 5th of his career. It was Grosjean's only title of the year and the 7th of his career.

Women's doubles

 Virginia Ruano Pascual /  Paola Suárez defeated  Svetlana Kuznetsova /  Elena Likhovtseva 6–1, 6–2
 It was Ruano Pascual's 2nd title of the year and the 29th of her career. It was Suárez's 2nd title of the year and the 36th of her career.

References

External links
 
 Association of Tennis Professionals (ATP) tournament profile
 WTA Tournament Profile

 
Pacific Life Open
Pacific Life Open
2004
Pacific Life Open
Pacific Life Open